Page Turner is a three-episode drama special by KBS2 starring Kim So-hyun, Ji Soo and Shin Jae-ha which aired in 2016.

The drama was well-received in Korea. The number of video previews released in web and mobile was reported to have surpassed 600,000, an unusual figure for a one-play act. Moreover, it was praised for its well-written plot and aptly depicted emotions of teenage years. It is the first drama to be aired on Pooq.

Synopsis
Story of a piano prodigy Yoon Yoo-seul who goes blind after a car accident, and struggles to get her life back on track with the help of Jung Cha-sik, a fellow aspiring pianist and Seo Jin-mok, her former rival who later becomes a supporter.

Cast

Main cast
 Kim So-hyun as Yoon Yoo-seul
 Lee Do-yeon as young Yoon Yoo-seul 
 Ji Soo as Jung Cha-sik
 Shin Jae-ha as Seo Jin-mok
 Jo Yong-jin as young Seo Jin-mok

Supporting cast
 Ye Ji-won as Yoon Yoo-seul's mother
 Hwang Young-hee as Jung Mi-soo (Jung Cha-sik's mother)
 Kim Min-sang as Seo Jin-mok's father
 Kim Dong-hee as Choi Sang-pil
 Yoo Yeon-mi as Lee Kyu-sun
 Han Sung-sik as High school teacher
 Chae Min-hee as High school teacher
 Seo Jin-wook
 Kim Min-chae
 Chun Ye-won
 Hwang Min-hyuk
 Im Ho as Yoon Yoo-seul's doctor
 Ahn Jae-mo as Jung Cha-sik's doctor

Special appearances
 Oh Kwang-rok as Street vendor
 Park Jong-hoon as Han Myung-se

Ratings
In the table below,  represent the lowest ratings and  represent the highest ratings.

Awards and nominations

References

External links
 

Korean Broadcasting System television dramas
2016 South Korean television series debuts
2016 South Korean television series endings
South Korean musical television series
Television series about teenagers
Television series by IHQ (company)
South Korean teen dramas
Television shows written by Park Hye-ryun